Michaela Musilová (born September 25, 1989 in České Budějovice) is a Czech sport shooter. Musilova represented the Czech Republic at the 2008 Summer Olympics in Beijing, where she competed in two pistol shooting events, along with her teammate Lenka Marušková. She placed thirty-fifth out of forty-four shooters in the women's 10 m air pistol, with a total score of 375 points. Three days later, Musilova competed for her second event, 25 m pistol, where she was able to shoot 288 targets in the precision stage, and 283 in the rapid fire, for a total score of 571 points, finishing only in thirty-fourth place.

References

External links
 
 NBC 2008 Olympics profile

Czech female sport shooters
Living people
Olympic shooters of the Czech Republic
Shooters at the 2008 Summer Olympics
Sportspeople from České Budějovice
1989 births
21st-century Czech women